Communist Electoral Front (Marxist–Leninist) was a far-left political movement in Portugal. FEC(m-l) was launched by Portuguese Marxist-Leninist Communist Organization (OCMLP) in December 1974, and it held its first congress in January 1975. FEC(m-l) participated in the Constituent Assembly elections.

Defunct communist parties in Portugal
Political parties established in 1974
1974 establishments in Portugal